Indietracks was an annual indie pop music festival at the Midland Railway in Butterley, Derbyshire, England. The main site was located at Swanwick Junction. Bands played in variety of locations,  including a restored church, in a train shed, and on the moving trains themselves. The event was staffed by volunteers, with the proceeds from the festival going towards the upkeep and renovation of the site and trains.

The first indiepop event held at the centre was in April 2007, organised by steam train restorer Stuart Mackay. Indietracks was established as a two-day festival in summer that year.

Reviewing the 2011 festival, Malcolm Jack of The Guardian described the artists as "so obscure you have to wonder if they've even heard of themselves". He writes, "Indietracks does little to dispel the notion of indie-pop fans being given to whimsy. It's the annual gathering of the twee tribe – think lovers of a broad church of outsider sounds from C86-inspired three-chord shambling to riot grrrl and anti-folk."

The festival inspired compilation albums, released annually.

In November 2021, the festival organisers announced that 2019's event would be the last Indietracks, citing the pandemic as a primary reason for the festival not continuing.

Line-ups

References

External links

Music festivals in Derbyshire
Indie pop
2007 establishments in England
Indie rock festivals
Music festivals established in 2007